The Gnostic Preludes (subtitled Music of Splendor) is an album composed by John Zorn and released on the Tzadik label in March 2012. It was the first album by Carol Emanuel, Bill Frisell, and Kenny Wollesen who became known as The Gnostic Trio.

Reception

Allmusic said  "The Gnostic Preludes is poetic, deceptively simple, and spiritually vast in scope." All About Jazz stated "Gnostic Preludes is an intriguing and seductive recording, with a gentle and contemplative feeling that resonates with emotive power. It combines the feel of ambiance music with lyrical and melodic prowess seldom seen in Zorn's work. As such, it is a moving work well worth surrendering to." Martin Schray commented "Zorn draws his inspiration from philosophical sources as different as the ideas the Kabbalah, natural mysticism or – obviously in this case – Gnosticism, which might have been a reason to establish his series of 21st century mystical music. The Gnostic Preludes tries to integrate all these spiritual influences in a musical way."

Track listing
All compositions by John Zorn

Personnel
Carol Emanuel – harp 
Bill Frisell – guitar
Kenny Wollesen – vibraphone, bells

References

John Zorn albums
Albums produced by John Zorn
Tzadik Records albums
2012 albums